Ahmed Nagui Salem (born 1953) is an Egyptian footballer. He competed in the men's tournament at the 1984 Summer Olympics.

References

External links
 

1953 births
Living people
Egyptian footballers
Egypt international footballers
Olympic footballers of Egypt
Footballers at the 1984 Summer Olympics
Place of birth missing (living people)
Association football goalkeepers
Al Ahly SC players
Tersana SC players